Rebecca Alana Rolfe (born 27 November 1986) is an Irish former cricketer who played as a right-handed batter. She appeared in 8 One Day Internationals and 2 Twenty20 Internationals for Ireland between 2011 and 2014. She played in the 2017 Women's Super 3s for Typhoons.

References

External links

1986 births
Living people
Cricketers from County Dublin
Irish women cricketers
Ireland women One Day International cricketers
Ireland women Twenty20 International cricketers
Typhoons (women's cricket) cricketers